Margo Sybranda Everdina Scharten-Antink (September 7, 1868 – November 27, 1957) was a Dutch poet. She was born in Zutphen and died in Florence, Italy. In 1928 she and her husband Carel Scharten won a bronze medal in the art competitions of the Olympic Games for their "De nar uit Maremmen" ("The Fool in Maremma").

References

External links
 profile 
 

1869 births
1957 deaths
Dutch women poets
Olympic bronze medalists in art competitions
People from Zutphen
Medalists at the 1928 Summer Olympics
Olympic competitors in art competitions